Trần Đình Khương (born 10 January 1996) is a Vietnamese footballer who plays as a midfielder for V.League 1 side .

International career
Trần was first called up to the Vietnam senior side in March 2017, and made his debut in a friendly against Chinese Taipei.

Personal life
He is the brother of Sanna Khánh Hòa BVN teammate, Trần Đình Kha.

Career statistics

Club

Notes

International

References

1996 births
Living people
Vietnamese footballers
V.League 1 players
Vietnam international footballers
Association football midfielders